The Sphinx of Haches is an Iberian sculpture depicting a sphinx. It is exhibited at the Albacete Provincial Museum.

Presented as an example of the increasing influence of Greek colonists from the 5th century BC forward in the territory of the Iberian Peninsula currently occupied by the Spanish region of Castilla–La Mancha, the smile of the mythical creature is reminiscent of those of the korai from the ancient Greek sculpture of the Archaic period.

The piece was found in 1947 in the Cerro de los Gavilanes, near the tower of Haches (municipality of Bogarra) during the course of some agricultural works.

References 
Citations

Bibliography

External links 
 

Iberian art
5th-century BC sculptures
Archaeological discoveries in Spain
Stone sculptures in Spain
Collection of the Albacete Provincial Museum
Sphinxes